Mackenzie Eryn Brannan (born May 17, 1996, in Austin, Texas) is a former American artistic gymnast. She won the Senior competition at Nastia Liukin Cup in 2014 in Greensboro, NC with McKenna Kelley. She currently competes in college gymnastics for the Alabama Crimson Tide gymnastics team.

Her college gymnastics debut came in 2015 with her school University of Alabama.

References 

1996 births
American female artistic gymnasts
Level 10 gymnasts
Alabama Crimson Tide women's gymnasts
Living people